José Arnoldo Alemán Lacayo (born 23 January 1946) is a Nicaraguan politician who served as the 81st president of Nicaragua from 10 January 1997 to 10 January 2002. In 2003, he was convicted of corruption and sentenced to a 20-year prison term; the conviction was overturned by the Supreme Court of Nicaragua in 2009.

Early life
Alemán was born in Managua and received his early education at the La Salle institute in Managua.  His father was a prominent lawyer who was an associate of the 1970s Nicaraguan dictator Anastasio Somoza Debayle and served as Somoza's minister of education for a period, and the family owned a large coffee plantation south of Managua.

In 1967 he graduated with a law degree from the Universidad Nacional Autónoma de Nicaragua-León with specializations in regional economic integration and financial law.  Between 1968 and 1979, he worked as a lawyer in the commercial and banking world. He became an official in the government of Anastasio Somoza Debayle. In 1980 he was arrested by the Sandinista junta, had some of his property seized and spent nine months in prison.  The period of his arrest coincided with the death of his father. This kept him from attending his father's funeral. After he was released from prison, he spent some time in the United States.

Upon his return to Nicaragua, Alemán became heavily involved in business, political, and academic activities.  He was a member of the Consejo Superior de la Empresa Privada (COSEP, 1988–1990), vice-president of the Unión de Productores Agropecuarios de Nicaragua (UPANIC, 1986–1990).  He was president of the Asociación de Cafetaleros de Managua (1983–1990); the Unión de Cafetaleros de Nicaragua (UNCAFENIC, 1986–1990); the Federación de Municipios de América Central (1992–1993) and of the Federación Municipal de Ciudades de Centroamérica (1993–1995). He also imparted conferences at Tulane University and at Florida International University in the United States.

Political career
In the early 1990s he became mayor of Managua after serving for two months as a councillor in Managua. He was popular due to his urban renewal projects which helped spruce up the city, severely damaged and never rebuilt after a 1972 earthquake. He became known as "El Gordo" ("The Fat Man").

Alemán became president of the Liberal Alliance and helped to resurrect it. Besides the PLC, other members of this alliance were the Partidos Neoliberal (PALI), Liberal Independiente de Unidad Nacional (PLIUN) and the Liberal Nacionalista (PLN). On 1 September 1995 he resigned as mayor in order to be able, under Nicaraguan law, to stand as a candidate in the forthcoming presidential election.

In 1996 he campaigned for president as the Liberal Alliance's candidate under a strong anti-Sandinista platform. It is reported that unidentified individuals attempted to shoot Alemán, killing one of his bodyguards in the process. He defeated Daniel Ortega, the Sandinista leader, by 48% of the vote to Ortega's 40%. Many claimed widespread election fraud and Ortega refused to concede.

Alemán was successful in promoting economic recovery with reduced inflation and growth of GDP. Foreign investment grew during his administration, which helped to improve Nicaragua's infrastructure. Under his slogan of "Obras, no palabras!" ("Actions, not words"), Alemán directed a comprehensive reconstruction of the roadway system throughout Nicaragua. In the 1980s roads had deteriorated to the point that many were little more than sparsely paved dirt trails. Alemán also created a program to build schools throughout Nicaragua in some of the poorest regions.

He has participated in international conferences and awards given to him include the Orden Nacional al Mérito of the Colombian government and the Orden de Isabel la Católica of the Spanish government.

His first wife, Maria Dolores Cardenal Vargas died of cancer in 1989. Alemán has two sons and two daughters by his first wife. On 23 October 1999, ten years after the death of his first wife, he married Maria Fernanda Flores Lanzas, with whom he has two daughters and a son.

Electoral history

Elections for mayor of Managua 1990 

Managua mayor elected by acclamation of the Managua City Council 26 April 1990.

Arnoldo Aleman Lacayo, a lawyer by profession, was one of the 20 councilors of the National Opposition Union (UNO), elected for a term of six years in general elections and municipals of 25 February 1990, these 20 councilors, 16 belonged for the UNO, and the other 4 the Sandinista National Liberation Front. Subsequently, at its first session, the city council chose from among its members the mayor of Managua in the person of Dr. Arnoldo Aleman Lacayo and mayor substitute functions of vice mayor, in the person of Roberto Cedeño Borgen engineer.

Presidential election results, 20 October 1996

Presidential election results, 6 November 2011

Corruption charges and conviction

Alemán, constitutionally barred from another term, was succeeded by his vice president, Enrique Bolaños. Allegations emerged that Alemán had concealed massive corruption in his administration. At the end of his presidency, public information about alleged corruption committed under his government became available.

Bolaños accused Alemán of widespread corruption in the Alemán administration. The scheme was reported to have involved several members of Arnoldo Alemán's closest family, including a brother and sister. Ex–ministers and close friends were also charged, some of whom fled the country. However, one of the central figures in the corruption plot, the former chief of the Department of Taxes Byron Jeréz, was imprisoned "on the basis of another charge of corruption. All in all, fourteen persons were charged." Several foreign governments froze Alemán's bank accounts in their countries and threatened to confiscate the funds. In such cases, his defense has been to claim that the funds were not stolen, but that they came from his coffee plantations.

Alemán was formally charged in December 2002, and on 7 December 2003 he was sentenced to a 20-year prison term for a string of crimes including money laundering, embezzlement and corruption. During his trial, prosecutors produced evidence showing that he and his wife had made extremely large charges to government credit cards, "including a $13,755 bill for the Ritz Carlton hotel in Bali and $68,506 for hotel expenses and handicrafts in India." In addition prosecutors allege that on top of the $30,878 he spent at the Taj Mahal Hotel in India during a vacation, in Cairo in 1999, he charged $22,530 at a carpet shop, and in August that year, charged $3,867 at the Biltmore Hotel in Coral Gables, Florida, for his engagement party. He also used $25,955 for a honeymoon trip to Italy after his wedding.  All of these expenses, along with others, have contributed to the growing concerns about the political corruption scandals in Nicaragua, a nation where the average citizen earns about $430 a year. Because of health problems, he had been serving his prison term under house arrest.  He was also barred from entering the United States. In 2004, Transparency International named him the ninth most corrupt leader in recent history, estimating that he had looted the country of $100 million in state funds to Panamanian bank accounts controlled by him and his family and then funneled some of the money to his party's candidates affiliates.

Meanwhile, following his presidency, Alemán developed a strategic alliance with Daniel Ortega to rule without effective opposition by offering employment in public offices and other privileges to key members of the Sandinista party, in order to stabilize the country. There are those who claim that the main purpose of this agreement, which led to a constitutional reform, was to distribute the institutions of the state in proportion to the power managed by the two main political parties of the country.

On 16 January 2009, Nicaraguan Supreme Court justices and Chief Justice Manuel Martinez overturned the 20-year corruption sentence against former President Arnoldo Alemán.  The decision generated some controversy: "stunned opposition lawmakers immediately suspected a secret deal between Mr. Alemán, ranked one of the world's 10 most corrupt leaders ever by Transparency International, and Daniel Ortega, President of Nicaragua and leader of the Sandinista Party, who wields considerable influence and control over the courts. "He's handing over the National Assembly in exchange for his personal liberty", said Congressman Enrique Saenz. Mr. Alemán, who denies the allegation, said, "Justice has finally been served"."

The following president, Enrique Bolaños, who served under Aleman as his vice president, succeeded him in January, pledging to clean up the corruption in the nation's government, which put him at odds with his predecessor and his administration.

On 9 November 2020, the United States Department of State put Alemán on a list of corrupt foreign officials and also barred his family from entering the country.

Bibliography 
Anderson, Leslie "The Authoritarian Executive? Horizontal and Vertical Accountability in A New Democracy: A Nicaraguan Perspective," Latin American Politics and Society Vol. 48, No. 2 (Summer 2006), 141-69.
Close, David and Kalowatie Deonandan. eds. 2004.  Undoing Democracy: The Politics of Electoral Caudillismo.  Lanham: Lexington Books.
Kampwirth, Karen.  2003.  "Arnoldo Alemán Takes on the NGOs: Antifeminism and the New Populism in Nicaragua" Latin American Politics and Society Vol. 45. No. 2.  (Summer).  pp. 133–158.
McConnell, Shelley A. "Nicaragua's Turning Point," Current History (February 2007), 83-88.

References

External links
Biography by CIDOB 

Presidents of Nicaragua
1946 births
People from Managua
Living people
Presidents of the National Assembly (Nicaragua)
Nicaraguan money launderers
Nicaraguan prisoners and detainees
Heads of government who were later imprisoned
Prisoners and detainees of Nicaragua
Mayors of Managua
Constitutionalist Liberal Party politicians
Nicaraguan politicians convicted of crimes